The  "AC Train" was an experimental 5-car electric multiple unit (EMU) train operated by East Japan Railway Company (JR East) in Japan between 2002 and 2006.

Concept
The E993 series "AC Train" ("Advanced Commuter Train") was developed by JR East to test and evaluate a number of new technologies and features for possible use in future commuter train designs. These included features intended to reduce life-cycle costs, improve the interior passenger environment, improve accessibility, and increase environmental friendliness.

Technological features
The train incorporated the following features for evaluation.
 Articulated cars with shared bogies
 Direct drive motors (DDM)
 Double-skin body construction
 Externally slung sliding doors
 Advanced Train Information Management System (AIMS)

Formation
The 5-car articulated set was based at Kawagoe Depot on the Kawagoe Line and formed as shown below, with car 1 at the Kawagoe end, and car 5 at the Shinjuku end. Cars 1 and 2 were built by Kawasaki Heavy Industries in Kobe, and cars 3 to 5 were built by Tokyu Car Corporation in Yokohama.

Cars 2 and 4 were each fitted with one single-arm pantograph.

Cars 1 and 2 had double-skin aluminium bodies, cars 3 to 5 had stainless steel bodies with double-skin construction used for cars 3 and 5.

History

The train was delivered to JR East's Kawagoe Depot on 17 January 2002. Test running commenced on the Kawagoe Line and Saikyo Line the following month.

The train was officially withdrawn on 14 July 2006. No cars are preserved.

Features tested on the E993 series, including articulated cars and direct drive motors, were subsequently incorporated in the E331 series prototype train delivered in 2006.

References

Electric multiple units of Japan
East Japan Railway Company
Train-related introductions in 2002
Articulated passenger trains
Gearless electric drive
Experimental vehicles
Non-passenger multiple units
1500 V DC multiple units of Japan
Kawasaki multiple units
Tokyu Car multiple units